San Ignacio de Moxos Airport  is a public use airport serving the town of San Ignacio de Moxos in the Beni Department of Bolivia.

See also

Transport in Bolivia
List of airports in Bolivia

References

External links 
OpenStreetMap - San Ignacio
OurAirports - San Ignacio
SkyVector - San Ignacio
Fallingrain - San Ignacio Airport

Airports in Beni Department